San Tau is a village on Lantau Island, Hong Kong.

Administration
San Tau is a recognized village under the New Territories Small House Policy.

Conservation
San Tau Beach, a shallow sheltering beach on the west coast of Tung Chung Bay, covering an area of 2.7 hectares, was designated as a Site of Special Scientific Interest in 1994.

Access
San Tau is located along Tung O Ancient Trail.

See also
 List of coin hoards in China

References

Further reading

External links

 Delineation of area of existing village San Tau (Tai O) for election of resident representative (2019 to 2022)

Villages in Islands District, Hong Kong
Lantau Island